Mutant Enemy Productions is a production company that was created in 1996 by Joss Whedon to produce Buffy the Vampire Slayer. The company also produced the Buffy spin-off, Angel, and his two short-lived science fiction series, the space Western Firefly and his high-concept Dollhouse, produced by 20th Century Fox Television. Mutant Enemy also produced the internet series  Dr. Horrible's Sing-Along Blog and the film The Cabin in the Woods. Mutant Enemy produced the superhero series Agents of S.H.I.E.L.D. along with ABC Studios and Marvel Television. Most recently, Mutant Enemy produced the supernatural fiction series The Nevers for HBO.

Its offices (made out of glass bricks) were on the lot of 20th Century Fox in Los Angeles, previously the home of Chris Carter's Ten Thirteen Productions. According to March 2006's issue of UK magazine The Word, the offices were closed not long after Angel was cancelled.

Productions
The following table lists the production credits of Mutant Enemy.

Name and logo

Name
The name "Mutant Enemy" is taken from the song "And You and I" by progressive rock band Yes, of whom Whedon is a professed fan: "There'll be no mutant enemy/we shall certify/political ends/as sad remains will die." (On the special features of the Buffy DVDs, Whedon also says in an interview that he called his typewriter "mutant enemy".)

Original end-of-credits logo

The company's end-of-credits logo and mascot is an intentionally poorly animated vampire monster cartoon figure crossing the screen from right to left and saying, "Grr. Argh."  It was drawn and voiced by Whedon himself. In certain episodes of Buffy the animation was changed:

 "Becoming, Part Two": He says "Oooh, I need a hug" instead.
 "Amends": He wears a Santa hat.
 "Graduation Day, Part Two": He wears a graduation cap—the image used is a reversed logo from the U.S. national college honor society Mortar Board.
 "Once More, with Feeling": He sings the line in falsetto.
 "Storyteller": The monster (overdubbed by cast member Adam Busch) sings a line from the episode, "We are as Gods".
 "Chosen": He turns and pulls a face at the viewer.

The episode "Bargaining, Part One" references the end-of-credits logo. Tara gives Giles a small rubber monster and says "And a monster. Sort of a Sunnydale souvenir, we thought. Grr. Argh." In season seven of Buffy, there is a species of ancient Vampires called "Turok-Han" or Ubervamps. They look like more detailed versions of the Mutant Enemy.

In the canonical Buffy the Vampire Slayer: Season 8 comic books, issue 22 "Swell", on page 10, the slogan for an in-comic fictional product is "Vampy Cat! Grr! Argh! He'll love you to <obscured> the Santorio Corporation!"

Parodies
At the end of the credits of the animated sketch comedy parody show Robot Chicken, a parody of the Mutant Enemy, Inc. logo appeared with Joss Whedon (guest starring as himself) providing the "Grr... Argh..." As the enemy mutant rips apart the city, the scene cuts to an office where Joss Whedon is playing with dolls and an executive says to him, "Come on Joss, that's why you got kicked off Wonder Woman."

New end-of-credits logo
With The Nevers, the Mutant Enemy vampire end-credits logo was replaced. The new end-of-credits card features a typewriter, upon which the company's name is affixed as an embossed label maker label.

Members
Staff members of Mutant Enemy, all of whom have writing and/or production credits on at least one of the above shows, have included, in alphabetical order:

 Jeffrey Bell
 Elizabeth Craft
 Steven S. DeKnight
 Ben Edlund
 Jane Espenson
 Sarah Fain
 Tracey Forbes
 David Fury
 Drew Goddard
 Drew Z. Greenberg
 David Greenwalt
 Rebecca Rand Kirshner
 Tim Minear
 Marti Noxon
 Doug Petrie
 Mere Smith
 Maurissa Tancharoen
 Jed Whedon
 Joss Whedon
 Zack Whedon

References

External links
A Brief History of Mutant Enemy

Buffyverse
Fictional vampires
Film production companies of the United States
Television production companies of the United States
Privately held companies based in California
Companies based in Los Angeles
Mass media companies established in 1996
1996 establishments in California
Works by Joss Whedon